Pempelia lundbladi is a species of snout moth. It is found on Madeira.

References

Moths described in 1939
Phycitini